Ionuţ Iftimoaie (born August 26, 1978) is a retired Romanian kickboxer. Besides the K-1, Iftimoaie has fought for a number of other promotions including the Local Kombat and SUPERKOMBAT. He defeated names such as Freddy Kemayo, Petar Majstorović, Sergei Gur or Jorge Loren.

As of 28 September 2016, he was ranked the #7 light heavyweight in the world by LiverKick.com.

Personal life
He is married and has four children.

Kickboxing career
Iftimoaie faced Milan Dašić at K-1 ColliZion 2010 Croatia on March 27, 2010. Dašić won the fight by a first-round knockout.

Iftimoaie was scheduled to fight the K-1 veteran Ray Sefo at K-1 World Grand Prix 2010 in Bucharest on May 21, 2010. He lost the fight by unanimous decision.

Iftimoaie was scheduled to face Dževad Poturak at SUPERKOMBAT The Pilot Show on March 18, 2011. He lost the fight by unanimous decision.

Iftimoaie was scheduled to face Luca Panto at SUPERKOMBAT World Grand Prix IV 2011 on October 15, 2011. He won the fight by unanimous decision.

Iftimoaie was scheduled to face James Wilson at SUPERKOMBAT World Grand Prix 2012 on November 10, 2012, following a year long absence from the sport. He won the fight by unanimous decision.

Iftimoaie was scheduled to challenge the reigning Superkombat and WKN Super Cruiserweight champion Jorge Loren at SUPERKOMBAT World Grand Prix IV 2016 on August 6, 2016. He won the fight by unanimous decision.

Championships and awards

Kickboxing
2016 Combat Press Comeback Fighter of the Year
2016 WKN Diamond Super Cruiserweight Title
2016 SUPERKOMBAT Super Cruiserweight (-95 kg/209 lb) Championship (one time) 
2005 Fight.ro Fighter of the Year
2005 Fight.ro Most Popular Fighter

Kickboxing record

See also
List of male kickboxers
List of K-1 events

References

1978 births
Living people
Romanian male kickboxers
Heavyweight kickboxers
People from Comănești
SUPERKOMBAT kickboxers